Il Globo is an Italian language newspaper, published biweekly on Monday and Thursday in Melbourne, Australia. The newspaper's Sydney counterpart is La Fiamma.

History
It was established in Melbourne by Tarcisio Valmorbida and Ubaldo Larobina, and the first issue was published on November 4, 1959. Il Globo had a circulation of over 20,000 based on claimed circulation by the newspaper, one of the largest amongst non-English language publications in Australia.

Il Globo reports not only issues and news regarding Italy and Australia but reports on issues that relate to the local Italian-Australian community in Western Australia, South Australia, Northern Territory and Victoria

References

Notes

 Mascitelli, Bruno and Battiston, Simone (eds.) (2009), Il Globo. Fifty Years of an Italian Newspaper in Australia, Connor Court Publishing, Ballan, Victoria. 
 Mascitelli, Bruno and Battiston, Simone (2008), The Italian expatriate vote in Australia. Democratic right, democratic wrong or political opportunism?, Connor Court Publishing, Ballan, Victoria. 
 Pascoe, Robert (1987), Buongiorno Australia. Our Italian Heritage, Greenhouse Publications, Richmond, Victoria. 
 Pascoe, Robert (1989), 'The Italian Press in Australia,' in Abe (I.) Wade Ata and Colin Ryan, The Ethnic Press in Australia, Academia Press and Footprint Publications, Melbourne, Victoria, pp. 201–206.

External links
 
 

1959 establishments in Australia
Newspapers established in 1959
Italian-Australian culture in Melbourne
Italian-language newspapers
Newspapers published in Melbourne
Non-English-language newspapers published in Australia